Sokolniki is the name of the following places:

Poland
Gmina Sokolniki, a gmina in Łódź Voivodeship
Sokolniki, Dzierżoniów County, a village in southwestern Poland
Sokolniki, Środa Śląska County, a village in southwestern Poland
Sokolniki, Wrocław County, a village in southwestern Poland
Sokolniki, Wieruszów County in Łódź Voivodeship (central Poland)
Sokolniki, Zgierz County in Łódź Voivodeship (central Poland)
Sokolniki, Podkarpackie Voivodeship (southeast Poland)
Sokolniki, Garwolin County in Masovian Voivodeship (east-central Poland)
Sokolniki, Płock County in Masovian Voivodeship (east-central Poland)
Sokolniki, Gniezno County in Greater Poland Voivodeship (west-central Poland)
Sokolniki, Września County in Greater Poland Voivodeship (west-central Poland)
Sokolniki, Silesian Voivodeship (south Poland)
Sokolniki, Opole Voivodeship (southwest Poland)
Sokolniki, Goleniów County in West Pomeranian Voivodeship (northwest Poland)
Sokolniki, Pyrzyce County in West Pomeranian Voivodeship (northwest Poland)

Russia
Sokolniki District, a district of Eastern Administrative Okrug in the federal city of Moscow
Sokolniki, Russia, several rural localities
Sokolniki Arena, an indoor sporting facility in Moscow
Sokolniki Park, a park in northeastern Moscow
Sokolniki (Sokolnicheskaya line), a station on the Sokolnicheskaya Line of the Moscow Metro
Sokolniki (Bolshaya Koltsevaya line), a prospective station of the Moscow Metro, Line 11